Yonathan Kebede (born 12 August 1991) is an Ethiopian soccer player who made his international debut against South Sudan in the 2012 CECAFA Cup, scoring on his international debut. He currently plays for EEPCO Addis Ababa as a forward. He was named in Ethiopia's provisional squad for the 2013 Africa Cup of Nations.

References 

Association football forwards
Ethiopia international footballers
1991 births
Living people
Ethiopian footballers
Sportspeople from Addis Ababa